A list of films produced between 1898 and 1919 in the territory occupied by the present-day Republic of Azerbaijan, which at the time consisted of governorates that were part of the Russian Empire (1898–1918) and then the Azerbaijan Democratic Republic (1918–1919).

1898–1908

1910s

External links
 Azerbaijani film at the Internet Movie Database
 Azerbaycan Kinosu

1898
Lists of 1890s films
Films
Lists of 1900s films
Films
Lists of 1910s films
Films